The 2019 NCAA Division III football season is the component of the 2019 college football season organized by the NCAA at the Division III level in the United States. The regular season began on September 5 and culminated on November 16.

The season's playoffs ended with the NCAA Division III Football Championship (also known as the Stagg Bowl) at Woodforest Bank Stadium in Shenandoah, Texas, hosted by the University of Mary Hardin–Baylor.

It became the most-attended game in Division III history, with 45,161 fans watching Ithaca defeat Cortland 32–20.

Conference changes and new programs

Membership changes

Belhaven completed its transition to Division III and became eligible for the postseason.

Conference standings

Postseason
Twenty-seven conferences met the requirements for an automatic ("Pool A") bid to the playoffs.

There were no "Pool B" bids this year, slots normally allocated to schools not in a Pool A conference.

The remaining five playoff spots were at-large ("Pool C") teams.

Qualified teams

Automatic bids (27)

At-large bids (5)

Playoff bracket

See also
2019 NCAA Division I FBS football season
2019 NCAA Division I FCS football season
2019 NCAA Division II football season
2019 NAIA football season

References